Tom Tom Club is the debut studio album by Tom Tom Club, released in 1981, containing the UK hit singles "Wordy Rappinghood", which reached No. 7 in June 1981 and "Genius of Love", which reached No. 65 in October of the same year. It was re-released in the UK in 1982 to include "Under the Boardwalk", which reached No. 22 in August 1982. When released in the United States, "Genius of Love" peaked at No. 31 on the Billboard Hot 100. Both "Wordy Rappinghood" and "Genius of Love" topped the US dance chart.

The album was re-released on May 19, 2009, as a part of a two-CD deluxe package with the band's second album, Close to the Bone. The album was further reissued on Limited Edition white vinyl by Real Gone Music on March 1, 2019.

Slant Magazine listed the album at No. 87 on its Best Albums of the 1980s list.

Track listing
Composer credits as registered with ASCAP or APRA: all works by Tina Weymouth, Chris Frantz, Adrian Belew and Steven Stanley, unless otherwise noted below. First printings of the album simply give composer credit on all tracks to Tom Tom Club as a collective.

LP version

Side 1
 "Wordy Rappinghood" (Tina Weymouth, Lani Weymouth, Laura Weymouth, Frantz, Stanley) – 6:27
 "Genius of Love" – 5:34
 "Tom Tom Theme" (Belew, Frantz) – 1:25
 "L'éléphant" – 4:50

Side 2
 "As Above, So Below" – 5:23
 "Lorelei" (Tina Weymouth, Laura Weymouth, Frantz, Belew, Stanley) – 5:05
 "On, On, On, On..." (Tina Weymouth, Frantz, Belew) – 3:33
 "Booming and Zooming" (Tina Weymouth, Frantz, Belew) – 4:32

Cassette version

Side 1
 "Wordy Rappinghood"	
 "Genius of Love"	
 "Tom Tom Theme"	
 "L'éléphant"

Side 2
 "As Above, So Below"	
 "Lorelei" (Remix)
 "On, On, On, On..."	
 "Under the Boardwalk" (Kenny Young, Arthur Resnick)

CD version
 "Wordy Rappinghood" – 6:27
 "Genius of Love" – 5:34
 "Tom Tom Theme" – 1:24
 "L'éléphant" – 4:51
 "As Above, So Below" – 5:22
 "Lorelei" – 5:05
 "On, On, On, On..." – 3:33
 "Booming and Zooming" – 4:35
 "Under the Boardwalk" – 5:46
 "Lorelei" (Remix) – 6:17
 "Wordy Rappinghood" (Long version) – 6:42
 "Genius of Love" (Long version) – 7:26
Deluxe edition CD1
 "Wordy Rappinghood" – 6:27
 "Genius of Love" – 5:34
 "Tom Tom Theme" – 1:24
 "L'éléphant" – 4:51
 "As Above, So Below" – 5:22
 "Lorelei" (Album version) – 5:05
 "On, On, On, On..." – 3:33
 "Booming and Zooming"	 – 4:35
 "Under the Boardwalk" – 5:46
 "On, On, On, On..." (Remix) – 3:44
 "Lorelei" (Remix) – 6:17
 "Spooks" (Single version) – 6:32
 "Elephant" (Single version) – 5:12
 "(You Don't Stop) Wordy Rappinghood" (Single version) – 4:08

Personnel
Tom Tom Club
Tina Weymouth – lead vocals, bass guitar, co-producer
Chris Frantz – drums, co-producer
Adrian Belew – guitar
Monte Brown – guitar
Tyrone Downie – keyboards
Uziah "Sticky" Thompson – percussion
Lani Weymouth – vocals
Laura Weymouth – vocals
Loric Weymouth – vocals
either Benji Armbrister or Kendal Stubbs - bass guitar on "Genius of Love" (uncredited)

Technical
Steven Stanley – co-production, engineering, mixing
Benji Armbrister – engineering
Kendal Stubbs – engineering
James Rizzi – cover illustration

Charts

Weekly charts

Year-end charts

Certifications

References

External links

Tom Tom Club (Adobe Flash) at Radio3Net (streamed copy where licensed)

Tom Tom Club albums
1981 debut albums
Sire Records albums
Island Records albums
A&M Records albums
PolyGram albums
Warner Records albums
Albums produced by Chris Frantz
Albums produced by Tina Weymouth
Albums produced by Steven Stanley